Peter Keane (born 31 March 1955) is a former British slalom canoeist who competed from the mid-1970s to the late 1980s. He won a bronze medal in the C-1 team event at the 1983 ICF Canoe Slalom World Championships in Meran.

References

British male canoeists
Living people
Place of birth missing (living people)
Medalists at the ICF Canoe Slalom World Championships
1955 births